During the presidency of Barack Obama, the government eased enforcement of federal marijuana laws in U.S. states permitting cannabis use.

Contrastingly, Time reported in 2012, "Two years [after his first year in office], the Obama Administration is cracking down on medical marijuana dispensaries and growers just as harshly as the Administration of George W. Bush did."

According to Jessica Bulman-Pozen and Gillian E. Metzger in 2016, "in declining to enforce the federal Controlled Substances Act with respect to marijuana offenses in Colorado and Washington, the [Obama] Administration has accommodated those states’ decisions to legalize recreational marijuana use."

See also
 Cole Memorandum
 Eric Holder, served as the 82nd Attorney General of the United States from 2009 to 2015
 Michele Leonhart, former Administrator of the Drug Enforcement Administration
 Political positions of Barack Obama

References

Obama
Presidency of Barack Obama